Gábor Furdok is a Hungarian sprint canoer and marathon canoeist who has competed in the early 2000s. He won a bronze medal in the C-4 500 m event at the 2003 ICF Canoe Sprint World Championships in Gainesville.

References

Hungarian male canoeists
Living people
Year of birth missing (living people)
ICF Canoe Sprint World Championships medalists in Canadian
21st-century Hungarian people